Margarornis is a genus of passerine birds in the ovenbird family Furnariidae. They are found in South and Middle America. All four species in the genus have "treerunner" in their English name.

Taxonomy
The genus Margarornis was introduced in 1853 by the German naturalist Ludwig Reichenbach. The name combines the Ancient Greek margaron meaning "pearl" with ornis meaning "bird". The type species was designated by George Robert Gray in 1855 as Sittasomus perlatus Lesson. This taxon is now considered to be a subspecies of the pearled treerunner (Margarornis squamiger perlatus).

Species
The genus contains four species:

The white-throated treerunner is placed in the monotypic genus Pygarrhichas.

References

External links

 
Bird genera
Taxonomy articles created by Polbot
Taxa named by Ludwig Reichenbach
Taxa described in 1853